Heinz Röthke (19 January 1912 – 14 July 1966) was a German SS-Obersturmführer of Nazi Germany and a convicted war criminal. Röthke was the Gestapo Jewish expert in Paris and as such was in overall charge of the concentration camp in Occupied France as well as of the deportation of Jews, between 1940 and 1944, during the Holocaust.

Biography
Röthke first studied theology then Law graduating with a doctorate of law from the University of Berlin. He took over from Dannecker as chief of the Department for “Jewish Affairs” on 2 July of the same year. Under his supervision Jewish women, children, and elderly started to be sent to camps in addition to men.
Röthke served in this role until August 1944. His assistants were Ernst Heinrichsohn and Horst Ahnert. On 6 March he wrote in a memorandun:

In 1945 Röthke was found guilty of war crimes by a French tribunal and sentenced to death in absentia. He escaped to West Germany where he resumed his career as a lawyer and lived undisturbed in Wolfsburg. In October 1961, he received a monthly pension from the Free State of Bavaria. Röthke died a natural death in July 1966 in Wolfsburg.

References

Bibliography
 * Ernst Klee: Das Personenlexikon zum Dritten Reich. Fischer, Frankfurt am Main 2007. .
 Bernhard Brunner: Der Frankreich-Komplex: die nationalsozialistischen Verbrechen in Frankreich und die Justiz der Bundesrepublik Deutschland, Wallstein Verlag, Göttingen 2004, 
 Israel Gutman (Hrsg.): Enzyklopädie des Holocaust - Die Verfolgung und Ermordung der europäischen Juden, Piper Verlag, München/Zürich 1998, 3 Bände, 
 
 
 
 Ahlrich Meyer: Täter im Verhör. Die „Endlösung der Judenfrage“ in Frankreich 1940–1944, WBG, Darmstadt 2005, .

1912 births
1966 deaths
Lawyers in the Nazi Party
Reich Security Main Office personnel
SS-Obersturmführer
Holocaust perpetrators in France
Nazis sentenced to death in absentia
Humboldt University of Berlin alumni
20th-century German lawyers